Squalidus iijimae is a species of cyprinid fish endemic to Taiwan.

Named in honor of zoologist Isao lijima (also spelled Ijima, 1861-1921), Science College, Imperial University of Tokyo.

References

Squalidus
Taxa named by Masamitsu Ōshima
Fish described in 1919